European Amateurs or variant, may refer to:

 European Amateur Championship (golf), annual amateur male golf tournament of the European Golf Association 
 European Ladies Amateur Championship (golf), annual amateur female golf tournament of the European Golf Association 
 European Amateur Team Championship (golf), annual amateur male golf tournament of the European Golf Association 
 European Ladies' Team Championship (golf), annual amateur female golf tournament of the European Golf Association 
 European Amateur Boxing Championships

See also

 
 
 
 European Championship (disambiguation)
 European Open (disambiguation)
 European Masters (disambiguation)